Phylloicus aeneus is a species of caddisfly in the family Calamoceratidae. It is found in Central America.

References

Trichoptera
Articles created by Qbugbot
Insects described in 1861